Michael O'Higgins is an Irish economist. Since 2012 he has been Chair of the NHS Confederation.

He was the chairman of The Pensions Regulator until 2013 and was chair of the Audit Commission from 2006 to 2012. He is also a non-executive director of HM Treasury and chair of the Treasury Group Audit Committee. Previously, he was a non-executive director of Oxford Medical Diagnostics plc. He was also a managing partner with PA Consulting, leading its Government and IT Consulting Groups. He was formerly a partner at Price Waterhouse, and worked at the Organisation for Economic Co-operation and Development in Paris. He has held academic posts at the University of Bath, the London School of Economics, Harvard University and the Australian National University.

References

National Health Service people
Living people
20th-century Irish economists
Year of birth missing (living people)